Showkatabad may refer to:
 Showkatabad, Kerman (شوكت آباد - Showḵatābād)